Vitiligo ponctué is a cutaneous condition, an unusual form of vitiligo, characterized by small confetti-like or tiny, discrete macules that may occur on otherwise normal or unusually darkened skin.

See also 
 Quadrichrome vitiligo
 List of cutaneous conditions

References 

Disturbances of human pigmentation